CHHU-FM is a radio station which broadcasts multicultural and multilingual programming at 99.1 MHz in Halifax, Nova Scotia, Canada. The station is owned by Radio Moyen-Orient (Middle East Radio) and licensed to Antoine "Tony" Karam (on behalf of a corporation to be incorporated), who received CRTC approval on September 15, 2015.

CHHU plans on broadcasting programming in ten languages, though its main target audience will be Halifax's Arabic-speaking community, as the station broadcasts only in Arabic during the day and in other languages at night. CHHU currently has no studio in the Halifax area, though they intend on building one in the future; in the interim, programming will originate from a dedicated studio at its Montreal sister station, CHOU.

CHHU began testing on 99.1 MHz on Friday, February 26, 2016; and regular broadcasting started in April 2016.

See also
CHOU (AM)
CHHU-FM history - Canadian Communication Foundation

References

Hhu
Hhu
Arab-Canadian culture
Arabic-language radio stations
Radio stations established in 2016
2016 establishments in Nova Scotia